Presidential elections were held in Chile in July 1851. Carried out through a system of electors, they resulted in the election of Manuel Montt as President. Montt was the country's first non-military president.

Montt's opponent, José María de la Cruz, refused to accept the results and started a rebellion, the Revolution of 1851, in Concepción. He was defeated by former president Manuel Bulnes.

Results

References

Presidential elections in Chile
Chile
1851 in Chile
Election and referendum articles with incomplete results